KWBY (940 AM) is a radio station broadcasting a Regional Mexican format. Licensed to Woodburn, Oregon, United States, it serves the Portland, Oregon area.  The station is currently owned by Edward C. Distell.

External links

WBY
Woodburn, Oregon
Radio stations established in 1987
1987 establishments in Oregon